A list of British films released in 2006.

2006

See also
 2006 in film
 2006 in British music
 2006 in British radio
 2006 in British television
 2006 in the United Kingdom
 List of 2006 box office number-one films in the United Kingdom

References

External links

2006
Films
British